Istorrent is an Icelandic Internet community devoted to BitTorrent file sharing. It was founded on May 1, 2005.

On November 19, 2007 the district court ordered the site to be shut down, requested by several copyright holder advocates (SMÁÍS, SÍK, Samband tónskálda og eigenda flutningsréttar and Félag hljómplötuframleiðenda). The order was reversed in May 2008 when the Icelandic Supreme Court ruled that plaintiffs had no legal ground to pursue the injunction that brought the tracker down.

References

External links
Official Website
Movies123 Website 
The Pirate Filmes Website

BitTorrent websites